Walnut Creek is a stream in Linn County, Kansas and Bates County, Missouri in the United States. It is a tributary of the Marais des Cygnes River.

Walnut Creek was named for the black walnut timber along its course.

See also
List of rivers of Missouri

References

Rivers of Linn County, Kansas
Rivers of Bates County, Missouri
Rivers of Kansas
Rivers of Missouri